The 1915 All-Ireland Senior Football Championship Final was the 28th All-Ireland Final and the deciding match of the 1915 All-Ireland Senior Football Championship, an inter-county Gaelic football tournament for the top teams in Ireland. 

Wexford won by three points; their goals were scored by Jim and Aidan Byrne, while Dick Fitzgerald and Denis Doyle got Kerry's goals.

It was the first of four consecutive All-Ireland football titles won by Wexford between 1915 and 1918.

Seán O'Kennedy, whose brother Gus played at corner-forward, captained Wexford.

References

Gaelic football
All-Ireland Senior Football Championship Finals
Kerry county football team matches
Wexford county football team matches